The Burmese census is an official count of the human population in Burma (Myanmar).

History
The earliest census on record in Burmese history was taken in 1359 in the Pinya Kingdom. The first nationwide census was taken in 1638, and it was followed by two other nationwide censuses in 1784 and 1803. The first modern census was taken in 1891 in the British colonial period. It was carried out in 10-year intervals until 1941. In the post-independence area, the census has been conducted 3 times, in 1973, 1983, and 2014.

2014 Census

References 

 
Demographics of Myanmar